Each of the Lugbara clans in Uganda has a distinct totem to represent it based on a characteristic living thing found in the clan's area. Nevertheless, the O'du (Leopard) is the general emblem representing all Lugbara and Arua.

Symbols

See also
 Lugbara cuisine
 Lugbara language
 West Nile sub-region

Lugbara